Henry Horn (1786–1862) was an American politician.

Henry Horn may also refer to:

Henry S. Horn (1941–2019), American ecologist
George Henry Horn (1840–1897), American entomologist

See also
Henry Horne (disambiguation)